Jean Nachega is a Congolese American physician who is an Associate Professor of Medicine at the University of Pittsburgh. He is an infectious diseases doctor with a focus on improving the public health outcomes of people infected with HIV/AIDS. He is a Fellow of the African Academy of Sciences.

Early life and education 
Nachega was born in the Democratic Republic of the Congo. He completed his undergraduate studies at the Facultes Universitaires Notre Dame de la Paix in Belgium. He moved to the Catholic University of Leuven for his medical degree. He returned to the Democratic Republic of the Congo, where he completed his clinical rotation in Kinshasa. After earning his medical degree, Nachega moved to the Johns Hopkins Bloomberg School of Public Health, where he completed a Masters of Public Health. Nachega moved to the London School of Hygiene and Tropical Medicine to study for a Diploma in Tropical Medicine and Hygiene, which he completed in 2000. He earned a doctorate at the University of Cape Town in 2009. His doctoral research considered antiretroviral therapy adherence and effectiveness.

Research and career 
Nachega's career is in infectious diseases and epidemiology, with a focus on HIV. He has shown that adherence to non-nucleoside reverse-transcriptase inhibitor HIV therapy has a linear dose-response pattern. He was elected to the African Academy of Sciences in 2018. In 2020, he was awarded $130 million as part of the National Institutes of Health Medical Education Partnership Initiative (MEPI)'s President's Emergency Plan for AIDS Relief. The program partnered with the African Forum for Research and Education in Health to strengthen medical school curricula and increased the number of graduates who would work in remote locations. Alongside improving awareness and treatment for HIV, Nachega has argued that Africa has to prepare to protect people from chronic diseases that will occur with ageing, such as cardiovascular disease and cancer.

Selected publications

References 

Living people
Université de Namur alumni
University of Pittsburgh faculty
University of Cape Town alumni
Year of birth missing (living people)
Alumni of the London School of Hygiene & Tropical Medicine
Harvard School of Public Health alumni
Johns Hopkins Bloomberg School of Public Health alumni
Catholic University of Leuven alumni
Fellows of the African Academy of Sciences